Pesaguero is a municipality located in the autonomous community of Cantabria, Spain.

Localities
Its 360 inhabitants (INE, 2006) live in:

 Avellanedo, 18 hab.
 Barreda, 38 hab.
 Caloca, 56 hab.
 Cueva, 25 hab.
 Lerones, 40 hab.
 Lomeña, 48 hab.
 Obargo, 12 hab.
 Pesaguero (Capital), 50 hab.
 Valdeprado, 41 hab.
 Vendejo, 32 hab.
 La Parte, 20 habitantes.

References

Municipalities in Cantabria